Biéville-Beuville is a commune in the Calvados department in the Normandy region in northwestern France. The hyphenated name originates from the former communes of Biéville-sur-Orne and Beuville, which were united in 1972.

Toponymy
The name Biéville is believed to come from the Old German name  Boio or Boia combined with the Old French ville, meaning farm. Biéville was recorded as Boiavilla in 1082. Residents (of the combined town) are still known as Boevillais.

Similarly, Beuville is believed to come from the Old German name  Bodo. It was recorded as Bodvilla in 1134.

Norman settlers from the area in Scotland and England carried surnames such as de Bouvelles, de Bovelles, de Boyuille and de Boyuill, and are believed to be the origin of the common surnames Boyle and Bowles.

History
Until the middle of the 16th century, the seignory of Beuville remained in the hands of the de Beuville family. In 1770, it fell to the Lecocq family; Louis Lecocq was the last lord of Beuville before the French Revolution overthrew the nobility.

The lordship of Bieville was a fiefferme (a fiefdom owned by the crown but leased to a local lord). The lords of Biéville were less powerful than the lords of other seignories such as Beuville, as their lands were not centralized. The lords of Biéville operated several other significant estates, including Rubercy, la Vallée, Balleroy, and la Londe.

During the Second World War, the British fought the Germans for more than a month nearby. The two parishes were united to form one commune in 1972.

Population
The population data before 1972 refer to the sum of the populations of the former communes Beuville and Biéville-sur-Orne.

See also
Communes of the Calvados department

References

External links

Official website

Communes of Calvados (department)
Calvados communes articles needing translation from French Wikipedia
Populated coastal places in France